Elisabet Delgado (born 10 June 1975) is a Spanish taekwondo practitioner. 

She won a gold medal in finweight at the 1991 World Taekwondo Championships in Athens. She won a silver medal in bantamweight at the 1993 World Taekwondo Championships in New York City, and a bronze medal at the 1997 World Taekwondo Championships in Hong Kong.

References

External links

1975 births
Living people
Spanish female taekwondo practitioners
World Taekwondo Championships medalists
20th-century Spanish women
21st-century Spanish women